Maccastorna is a comune (municipality) in the Province of Lodi in the Italian region Lombardy, located about  southeast of Milan and about  southeast of Lodi.

Sights include a 13th-14th-century castle and the c. 12th-century parish church (largely renovated in the 20th century).

Maccastorna borders the following municipalities: Crotta d'Adda, Meleti, Castelnuovo Bocca d'Adda. , it is the 11th least-populated Italian commune.

References

Cities and towns in Lombardy